The Savings Bank (formerly Wakefield Savings Bank) is a state-chartered mutual bank, headquartered in Wakefield,  Massachusetts and founded in 1869. It is one of the oldest banks in the United States. The Savings Bank has over $655 million in assets, and 9 branches, serving residents of Wakefield, Lynnfield, Andover, Methuen, North Reading, and surrounding cities and towns. It is a wholly owned subsidiary of Wakefield Bancorp, MHC,

History

The Savings Bank's heritage started in early 1869 with the idea of  Cyrus Wakefield, who along with other business leaders, petitioned for a charter to open a savings bank in Wakefield, Massachusetts. Starting with one physical location in 1869, the bank was chartered as the Wakefield Savings Bank. By 1871, the Wakefield Savings Bank had over $60,000 in deposits and over 500 depositors.

In 1981, The Savings Bank earned national and international recognition with the opening of the first student-operated banking branch in the nation, named the 1st Educational Savings Branch at Wakefield Memorial High School. In 2004, the branch was awarded an honorary certificate of recognition for its efforts in teaching financial education to high school students by the U.S. Department of the Treasury.

In 1985 The Savings Bank became FDIC insured and was assigned the FDIC certification number 90291.

In 1989, the bank's name changed to The Savings Bank to reflect its broader geographic footprint.

In 1997 the Trust Department of the bank was established, and the bank expanded its services to include Wealth Management services.

In 2005, The Savings Bank acquired the First Financial Trust, N.A.

In early 2013, The Savings Bank petitioned the Division of Banks (Division) and the Board of Bank Incorporation (Board) pursuant to Massachusetts General Laws chapters 167A and 167H, for permission to reorganise into a mutual holding company. On April 30, 2013, The Savings Bank reorganised into a mutual holding company, Wakefield Bancorp, MHC with a mid-tier holding company, Wakefield Bancorp, Inc.

In 2019, The Savings Bank celebrated its 150th anniversary.

Services 
Personal and business checking and savings
Money market
CDs
Individual Retirement Account savings
Commercial lending
Cash management services
Auto loans
Personal loans
Mortgage loans
Home equity loans
Free online banking
Electronic bill pay and electronic statements
Free mobile banking access
Free financial counselling
Wealth management services
Financial seminars
Debit cards
Direct deposit

Community involvement and charitable efforts
In 1997, The Savings Bank purchased, renovated, and restored the Odd Fellows building, one of Wakefield's landmarks, originally built in 1895, that suffered extensive damage in a January 24, 1997 devastating fire.

In 1997, The Savings Bank established the Charitable Foundation, Inc. The foundation supports non-profit organisations whose primary focus is on homeless shelters, family services, the poor, and the elderly.

In 2001, The Savings Bank established the Donald E. Garrant Foundation, Inc. in tribute to the memory of Don Garrant, former President and Chief Executive Officer of The Savings Bank during 1980- 1992. The foundation supports projects in public and private schools, grades K-12, and non-profit organisations that promote financial education in: saving, investing, borrowing and credit, and economics.

Since their founding, The Savings Bank Charitable Foundation and the Donald E. Garrant Foundation together have given back more than $1 million to community efforts.

In 2013, The Savings Bank was rated as "high satisfactory" on the Service Test performance under the Community Reinvestment Act (CRA), and "satisfactory" on the Lending and Investment Tests performance, by the Commonwealth of Massachusetts, for the bank's efforts in providing financial and personal empowerment through innovative and flexible lending programs designed to meet the credit needs of low and moderate-income borrowers, first-time homebuyers, and small businesses. In 2019, The Savings Bank was rated as "satisfactory" by the Commonwealth of Massachusetts for its performance under the CRA.

In 2018 and 2019, The Savings Bank provided a temporary home to the Tall Spire pre-school, previously located in Wakefield's First Baptist Church, that suffered extensive damage in an October 24, 2018 fire. The bank also collected monetary donations to help support the First Baptist Church.

Recognition and awards
In 2020, The Savings Bank received the Winner #1 Choice award in the category Community Bank / Credit Union in the Wicked Local Reader's Choice Awards.

In 2006, The Savings Bank was presented with a Friend of Public Education Award by The Massachusetts Association of School Committees, based on nominations from the individual School Committees throughout Massachusetts.

References

External links
Official website

Banks of the United States
Banks established in 1869
Companies based in Massachusetts
1869 establishments in Massachusetts